Center High School is a high school located in Center, Colorado, United States serving grades 9 through 12. The school is part of the Center Consolidated School District 26JT in Saguache County.

Notable Alumni
- Aucencio Martinez, Former distance runner, 2015 Adams State University Athletics Hall of Fame in inductee, 5X CHSAA State Champion

References

External links

Center Unified School district website

Public high schools in Colorado
Schools in Saguache County, Colorado